Antti Konstantin (Konsta) Talvio (5 June 1892, Mäntsälä – 9 August 1970) was a Finnish farmer and politician. He was imprisoned from 1918 to 1920 for having sided with the Reds during the Finnish Civil War. He was a Member of the Parliament of Finland from 1929 to 1930, representing the Socialist Electoral Organisation of Workers and Smallholders. Talvio was again imprisoned for political reasons from 1930 to 1933. He served yet another term as a Member of the Parliament of Finland from 1945 to 1948, this time representing the Finnish People's Democratic League (SKDL). He was a member of the Central Committee of the Communist Party of Finland (SKP).

References

1892 births
1970 deaths
People from Mäntsälä
People from Uusimaa Province (Grand Duchy of Finland)
Socialist Electoral Organisation of Workers and Smallholders politicians
Communist Party of Finland politicians
Finnish People's Democratic League politicians
Members of the Parliament of Finland (1929–30)
Members of the Parliament of Finland (1945–48)
People of the Finnish Civil War (Red side)
Prisoners and detainees of Finland